This is a list of members of the Maltese House of Representatives elected to the 14th legislature in the 2022 Maltese general election.

In the Parliament, the Labour Party holds a majority of seats after securing a third consecutive victory: 44 are members of the Labour Party, and 35 of the Nationalist Party.

Members 
The following are the 79 members, 65 of which were elected in the 13 districts, and 14 of which received a seat per the provisions laid out in the Constitution of Malta:

Notes

References 

Malta
Lists of members of the parliament of Malta